The 3rd Justice and Development Party Extraordinary Congress took place on 20 and 21 May 2017 in order to elect a party leader and members to the party congress of Turkey's ruling Justice and Development Party (AKP). The party's founder and first leader, Recep Tayyip Erdoğan, was the only candidate for the post, having left the leadership upon his election as President in 2014. Having been initially required to sever his political party relations on grounds of impartiality, a constitutional referendum in 2017 turned Turkey into an executive presidency, allowing Erdoğan to return to the AKP and become its leader.

Parliamentary group leader election
Three days after the congress concluded, the parliamentary group of the AKP met to elect a new parliamentary group leader in order to conform to the executive presidential system. The party's outgoing leader Binali Yıldırım, who vacated the leadership for Erdoğan, was elected unopposed with 300 votes out of 316 voting-elibile members of parliament.

See also
2017 Turkish constitutional referendum
2019 Turkish presidential election

References

2017 elections in Turkey
Justice and Development Party (Turkey)
May 2017 events in Turkey